Pancake is an unincorporated community in Hampshire County in the U.S. state of West Virginia. Pancake is located on Pancake Road (County Route 8/2), once connecting to South Branch River Road (County Route 8) across the South Branch Potomac River. Pancake was once a stop along the South Branch Valley Railroad and is named for the Pancake family in the immediate area. The Pancake Post Office has been closed.

References 

Unincorporated communities in Hampshire County, West Virginia
Populated places on the South Branch Potomac River
Unincorporated communities in West Virginia
South Branch Valley Railroad